Rai Zero (#0) was a comic book published by Valiant Comics in November 1992. Published after the events of Rai #8, the special served as a bridge for the reformatting of "Rai" as "Rai and the Future Force" with issue #9 by way of introducing Takao Konishi as the 43rd Rai. Rai Zero was written by Valiant's top talent: Jim Shooter, David Lapham and Bob Layton.

The special also featured the first appearance of Valiant hero Bloodshot as well as setting up a basic outline for the history of the Original Valiant Universe from 1992 until the post-"Unity" crossover in the 41st century. It also was used by Valiant as the springboard for the "Deathmate" crossover between Valiant and Image Comics, which caused the special to become sought after by collectors, staying on Wizard's Top 10 hot list for several months.

Story

The Blood of Heroes

When Unity compromised the timeline, it fell to the Geomancers to ensure the stability of reality.

It began when Geoff McHenry broke into Project Rising Spirit and rescued Angelo Mortalli, whose silicon–based blood gave him incredible strength and computer–like mental powers, a discovery that his creators found out the hard way when he killed them during his escape. Months later, the organization known as the H.A.R.D. Corps took an interest in Bloodshot’s activities.

In the spring of 1993, Geoff discovered several timeline anomalies and sought help from Aric Dacia, but the barbarian–born hero was having too much fun to notice the change in him. Aware that he had to meet the danger that was coming, Geoff got help wherever he could find it.

Geoff found Bloodshot and told him of the Darque Power, the Corporate War between Toyo Harada, the H.A.R.D. Corps, and other economic powers-that-be that took sides in the conflict, and warned him that the planet hovered on the threshold of dark times. Geoff was relentless in his crusade to recruit help against the Darque Power.

In 1999, these events came to a terrible finale when the dark vested hero Shadowman gave up his life to rid humanity of the Darque Power. When the heroes of Earth gathered to pay their respects to their fallen comrade, they all turned their wary eyes toward the future and the wars that loomed in the horizon.

As time passed, Obadiah Archer became a guru of sorts and, by 2020, his Archies were a symbol of peace and order in a turbulent world torn by warring corporations, though Obadiah knew that whatever he did was not enough. While the Harbinger Foundation grew stronger every day, Toyo Harada grew very old despite all his power and became obsessed with the secret of immortality, so he took desperate measures to secure them for himself and kidnapped Aram Anni-Padda. After Obadiah succeeded in rescuing his friend and repaid the debt that he owed him with his life, Aram vanished from the Earth for parts unknown; some believed that he went off–world, while others said that he finally succeeded in drowning his troubles.

In 2028, robotics and computers were the only defense against Harada’s mental powers, and while he fixated over the ability to control them, the Harbinger renegade Ax, who was determined to possess the Blood of Heroes, defeated Bloodshot in a battle on a lunar base and drained the blood from his body.

In 2056, Ax’s trail grew cold and he and the blood simply vanished, but Geoff never stopped looking for him. Ax was not the only person from that era who vanished; Pete Stanchek, the leader of the Harbinger Resistance, fell off the face of the Earth and left his daughter-in-law and grandchildren in the care of his best friend, Kris Hathaway, who lived a secluded life far removed from the strife that raged in the world around her. It was in those twilight years that Kris decided to put her feelings down in words and wrote a letter to the son that she bore but never knew, a child that would not enter the world for another nineteen centuries. Once she was done, Kris summoned Geoff McHenry to deliver her message through time.

In 2052, with the Earth divided into Corporate States, Toyo Harada controlled almost two-thirds of the world while the HARD Corps and its allies suffered devastating losses, but the worst was yet to come. After Geoff’s niece Lucinda Mendez replaced him as Geomancer, her unfortunate first duty was to bring the Harbinger resistance forces the distressing news that one of their comrades had died and their greatest fear had ensued. Lucinda explained that Orb Industries had fallen and Harada sought the life-prolonging capabilities of the Manowar Class Armor, which power Aric was determined would never serve the Harbinger Foundation or its master. Aric’s final command to the armor was to send it into the far reaches of space for parts unknown.

Harada was too late to stop Aric and his anger over losing the armor was monumental. After decades of conflict, Harada was determined to end Aric’s life and the two simultaneously dealt the other a fatal blow. While Aric died instantly, the withered Harada clung to life using all his psionic abilities to hold himself together, and, spurred by his approaching death, he successfully transferred his mind into the body of Aric’s wife. The news that their hated enemy had a new lease on life and the means to virtual immortality horrified the resistance, but, in their darkest hour, Faith Herbert, who for decades had been a leader of the Archies peace moment, came forth to lead them.

Elsewhere, another of history’s greatest heroes faced a tragic loss when Phil Seleski reluctantly dissipated the life-giving energy that had kept his lover Gayle Nordheim alive beyond her time. What happened after Gayle quietly died even the Geomancers were not sure; unable to contain his grief, Phil literally split in two, and while the other persona went off to find other planes of reality to explore, the Phil that remained went into seclusion and did not surface again until the alien invasion of 4001 A.D.

In 2900, the Harbinger Wars entered their final stage.

While Faith succeeded in uniting the resistance and kept Harada’s influence from spreading any further, the battered and battle–weary HARD Corps protected the remnants of normal humanity, who hid underground. On the day before what was to be the final battle, Geomancer Yuri Pierce informed the resistance’s leader John Stanchek that Harada had discovered the Blood of Heroes.

While Harbingers battled each other and suffered losses on both sides, John fought his way into Harada’s compound and challenged Toyo, who could not withstand his awesome mental abilities and never knew what hit him when John took control of his body and purged his consciousness. Once the resistance controlled the world, John slowly dismantled the Harbinger forces and restored order to the planet.

Shortly before Harada’s fall, the beleaguered HARD Corps began a mass evacuation aboard their surviving spaceships and refused to acknowledge any messages from Earth, while all that remained of humankind isolated themselves in the Corporate State of Japan. As the population grew and land became scarce, a continuous structure covered the land mass of the island state.

In 3050, the sophisticated computer brain that governed the centralized controls that handled the air, food, water, and waste management of Japan gained freewill, and once it determined the needs of the people and served them autonomously the government became a formality. Dubbed Grandmother due to its desire to care for and protect the people, she faced contempt from a group of citizens that felt oppressed by the lack of control over their lives who called themselves Anti-Grannies. To protect herself, Grandmother created the first Rai in the image of the 20th Century hero Bloodshot to serve as the spirit guardian of Japan.

After the Anti–Grannies discovered the Blood of Heroes in 3216, Grandmother worried that if they injected it into a suitable latent psionic he would posse total mental control over all electronic devices, including her, so she dispatched Sho Sugino, the second Rai, to retrieve the blood and destroy her enemies. Once Sho wrestled the silicone blood away from her enemies, Grandmother stored it deep within the substructures of Japan inside an impregnable vault so that no one would ever use its power against her.

When aliens invaded in 4001, Japan defeated the intergalactic threat in the form of dragon, but, during the battle, it sustained great damage that made it impossible to return. After Grandmother placed Japan in orbit over the planet, she left her people to govern themselves for the first time in a millennium.

During Unity, Erica Pierce forced Japan to crash on Earth and left its people devastated and without a country, while the last Rai, Tohru Nakadai, fell in battle against her and the Rai lineage died with him.

On April 10 4002, Rokland Tate took Takao Konishi, an Archie who the Earth guided him to, inside the Japan crash site to search for a hidden chamber. As Rokland urged him to be strong, as, no matter how bad Japan’s situation seemed, there were darker times ahead for the Earth, Takao doubted that he knew where the chamber was, but Rokland assured him that the walls told him where to find it.

A day later, they reached the vault where Grandmother kept the Blood of Heroes and Rokland told Takao to slice open his wrists to decrease the volume of his blood so the pressure would not rupture his arteries after he injected himself with the blood. Though Takao hesitated, he trusted Rokland and bravely sliced his wrists.

Shortly, Rokland placed the container that held the blood over Takao’s chest and injected him with it and within minutes, the blood healed Takao’s wrists. When Takao heard the blood talk to him, he asked Rokland what he had become, and the Geomancer told him that he was the last Rai, the protector of the future.

Behind the scenes
Rai Zero was written by Valiant's top talent: Jim Shooter, David Lapham and Bob Layton. Marketing director Jon Hartz also contributed to the story's overall plot. Originally, it was to be drawn by Rai regular artist Joe St. Pierre with a different script revealing the origin of the Rai Power. This story was scrapped in favor of the one published but several pages of art were produced and art available online.

Besides introducing the new Rai and Bloodshot, the special was designed to serve as a guidepost for all future Valiant Universe for the next decade, as well as giving fans a glimpse towards how the heroes of the "present day" Valiant books would affect the futuristic 41st Century Valiant titles. 

One storyline development though, the death of Solar's longtime girlfriend and his split into two separate entities, would ultimately be incorporated as catalyst for the Valiant/Image crossover "Deathmate". This caused the issue to become sought after by collectors, even though the scene in question was redrawn for the "Deathmate Prologue" special for fans who had not read the issue. 

The story was also reprinted in the only trade paperback collection for the original Rai series, which collected Rai #1-4.

Innovation
Rai #0, along with X-O Manowar, was one of the first "Zero Issues" comics to be produced and sold through normal direct market channels. While other Valiant comics had received "Zero Issues", they were only available via mail-order with fans having to send in coupons included in the main comics for the issue. 

The notion of "Zero Issues" would later be embraced by other comic publishers, most notably DC Comics, who in September 1994, had every one of their main comics publish a "#0 issue" rather than their normal regular issue.

References

External links
Valiant Entertainment official website
Rai entry at the Valiant Comics Encyclopedia
Valiant Comics Fan Site
Valiant Comics message board
VALIANT F.A.Q. aka Guide to the VALIANT Universe
The Ten Most Important Comic Books of the 1990s
"Valiant Days, Valiant Nights - A Look Back at the Rise and Fall of Valiant

Valiant Comics titles
1992 in comics